Peter Kiplagat Chebet (born 9 September 1982) is a Kenyan long-distance runner.

He won the Berkane International Road Race in 2001. At the 2002 Berlin Half Marathon he beat the field to finish in first place and also won the ten mile race at the Diecimiglia del Garda later that year. He was second at the 2005 Berlin Marathon (2:08:58).

He ran at the Košice Peace Marathon in October 2010 – his first competitive marathon since 2006 – and managed to improve his personal best to 2:08:42 and take third place on the podium.

Achievements

Personal bests
Half marathon - 1:00:56 hrs (2001) 
Marathon - 2:08:42 hrs (2010)

References

External links

1982 births
Living people
Kenyan male long-distance runners
Kenyan male marathon runners
20th-century Kenyan people
21st-century Kenyan people